

The Piper PA-7 Skycoupe was a 1940s American two-seat light aircraft designed and built by Piper Aircraft at Lock Haven. Towards the end of 1944 Piper announced a number of aircraft it intended to build after the war. One of these was the PWA-1 Skycoupe (Post War Airplane 1). A prototype was built in 1943, it was a two-seat side-by-side low-wing cantilever monoplane with a twin-boom fuselage with a tricycle landing gear. It had a Franklin 4ACG-199-H3 engine driving a pusher propeller. In 1945 it was redesignated the PA-7 Skycoupe but no further examples were built.

Specifications (PA-7)

References

 Roger W. Peperell and Colin M.Smith, Piper Aircraft and their forerunners, 1987, Air-Britain (Historians), Page 47 and 50.

PA-07
Single-engined pusher aircraft
1940s United States civil utility aircraft
Abandoned civil aircraft projects of the United States
Low-wing aircraft
Twin-boom aircraft
Aircraft first flown in 1944